In mathematics, an inner regular measure is one for which the measure of a set can be approximated from within by compact subsets.

Definition

Let (X, T) be a Hausdorff topological space and let Σ be a σ-algebra on X that contains the topology T (so that every open set is a measurable set, and Σ is at least as fine as the Borel σ-algebra on X). Then a measure μ on the measurable space (X, Σ) is called inner regular if, for every set A in Σ,

This property is sometimes referred to in words as "approximation from within by compact sets."

Some authors use the term tight as a synonym for inner regular. This use of the term is closely related to tightness of a family of measures, since a finite measure μ is inner regular if and only if, for all ε > 0, there is some compact subset K of X such that  μ(X \ K) < ε. This is precisely the condition that the singleton collection of measures {μ} is tight.

Examples

When the real line R is given its usual Euclidean topology,
 Lebesgue measure on R is inner regular; and
 Gaussian measure (the normal distribution on R) is an inner regular probability measure.
However, if the topology on R is changed, then these measures can fail to be inner regular.  For example, if R is given the lower limit topology (which generates the same σ-algebra as the Euclidean topology), then both of the above measures fail to be inner regular, because compact sets in that topology are necessarily countable, and hence of measure zero.

References

See also

 Radon measure
 Regular measure

Measures (measure theory)